Anthony Peter Clarke, Baron Clarke of Stone-cum-Ebony,  (born 13 May 1943) is a British lawyer. He was one of the first 11 Supreme Court of the United Kingdom Justices and was the first High Court judge to be appointed directly to that court when it came into existence on 1 October 2009 without previously having sat as a Lord of Appeal in Ordinary. He was appointed to the Court of Final Appeal of Hong Kong on 11 April 2011 as a non-permanent judge. He was previously Master of the Rolls and Head of Civil Justice in England and Wales. He retired from the Supreme Court in September 2017.

Early life and education
Clarke was born to Harry and Isobel Clarke. He was educated at Oakham School. In 1957 the trial of suspected serial killer John Bodkin Adams first made him interested in pursuing a career in the law. He read Economics and Law at King's College, Cambridge.

Career 
He was called to the Bar at Middle Temple in 1965. He developed a commercial and maritime law practice.

He became a Queen's Counsel in 1979, and was a Recorder sitting in both criminal and civil courts from 1985 to 1992. In 1993, Clarke became a High Court judge and, as is customary, was appointed a Knight Bachelor. He was allocated to the Queen's Bench Division and, in April 1993, he succeeded Mr Justice Sheen as the Admiralty Judge. He sat in the Admiralty Court, the Commercial Court and the Crown Court, trying commercial and criminal cases respectively.

Clarke was promoted to the Court of Appeal of England and Wales in 1998 and sworn of the privy council. Shortly thereafter, he led the Thames Safety Inquiry and in the following year the judicial inquiry into the Marchioness disaster. He was Master of the Rolls from 2005 until 2009.

On 15 April 2009, it was announced that he would be created a life peer, was gazetted on 29 May 2009 with the title of Baron Clarke of Stone-cum-Ebony, of Stone-cum-Ebony, in the County of Kent, and took his seat as a crossbencher in the House of Lords on 1 June 2009.
It was announced on 20 April 2009 that Clarke was to be appointed to the Supreme Court with effect from 1 October 2009.

Clarke retired from the Supreme Court in September 2017. He sat in the House of Lords until his retirement from the House on 14 September 2020.

A member of the Shipwrights' Company, Clarke was an Assistant from 2000 and Prime Warden for 2014–15.

Personal life 
He lives in Kent and London with his wife, Rosemary, née Adam, whom he married in 1968, and has three children - Ben, Thomas and Sally.

Arms

List of decided cases
Pennington v Waine
OFT v Abbey National plc
Autoclenz Ltd v Belcher

See also
Judicial titles in England and Wales

Notes

External links
The Court of Appeal (HM Courts Service)
Senior judiciary biographies – Master of the Rolls (Judicial Communications Office)
Debrett's People of Today
www.parliament.uk

1943 births
Living people
People educated at Oakham School
Alumni of King's College, Cambridge
Crossbench life peers
21st-century English judges
Knights Bachelor
Members of the Middle Temple
Members of the Privy Council of the United Kingdom
Queen's Bench Division judges
Masters of the Rolls
Judges of the Supreme Court of the United Kingdom
People from Kent
Justices of the Court of Final Appeal (Hong Kong)
20th-century English judges
Life peers created by Elizabeth II